Lewis County is a county located in the northeastern portion of the U.S. state of Missouri. As of the 2020 census, the population was 10,032. Its county seat is Monticello. The county was organized January 2, 1833 and named for Meriwether Lewis, the explorer and Governor of the Louisiana Territory.

Lewis County is part of the Quincy, IL–MO Micropolitan Statistical Area.

Geography

Adjacent counties
Clark County (north)
Hancock County, Illinois (northeast)
Adams County, Illinois (southeast)
Marion County (south)
Shelby County (southwest)
Knox County (west)

Major highways
 U.S. Route 61
 Route 6
 Route 81
 Route 156

History

Lewis County, located in the northeastern part of Missouri, across the Mississippi River from Illinois. It was established in 1833 and named after Meriwether Lewis of the Lewis and Clark Expedition. The county was largely settled by farmers from Virginia and Kentucky. They brought slaves and were attracted to the fertile land and easy river transportation. The economy was based on subsistance agriculture, timber harvesting, and lead mining.  In addition. Canton supplied riverboats on the Mississippi. During the Civil War, the county became the base for rival pro-Confederate and pro-Union sympathizers; there was some violence but the  Unionists prevailed. 

After the Civil War, the slaves were emancipated and the county's economy shifted towards commercial agriculture, with the production of corn, wheat and timber that were shipped through Canton, a port on the Mississippi River. In the late 19th and early 20th century, farm youth moved into small towns, particularly in the western part of the county. Mark Twain lived in the county briefly and was inspired by the natural beauty of the river region for his writing.

Today, Lewis County is all rural, with a few small towns under 2500 population, and Canton at 2800. The economy us built on soybeans, corn and timber, as well as higher education. Canton is the home of Culver–Stockton College. The National Register of Historic Places celebrates 12 historic locations in the county.

Demographics

As of the census of 2010, there were 10,211 people, 3,956 households, and 2,709 families residing in the county. The population density was 21 people per square mile. The racial makeup of the county was 95.92% White, 2.53% Black or African American, 0.16% Native American, 0.20% Asian, 0.02% Pacific Islander, 0.44% from other races, and 0.73% from two or more races. Approximately 0.73% of the population were Hispanic or Latino of any race. 34.9% were of German, 18.3% American, 11.2% English and 10.8% Irish ancestry.

The average household size was 2.46 and the average family size was 3.00. In the county, the population was spread out, with 25.00% under the age of 18, 12.90% from 18 to 24, 24.60% from 25 to 44, 21.40% from 45 to 64, and 16.10% who were 65 years of age or older and 51% of female population.  The median age was 36 years.

Median income for a household in the county was $30,651, and the median income for a family was $35,740. Males had a median income of $27,778 versus $19,679 for females. The per capita income for the county was $14,746.  16.10% of the population and 10.70% of families were below the poverty line.

2020 Census

Education

Public schools
Canton R-V School District – Canton
Canton Elementary School (PK-06)
Canton High School (07-12)
Lewis County C-1 School District – Ewing
Highland Elementary School (K-06)
Highland Junior-Senior High School (07-12)

Private schools
Cedar Falls School – Canton (K-12) – Nonsectarian

Post-secondary
Culver-Stockton College – Canton – A private, four-year Christian Church (Disciples of Christ) university.

Public libraries
Canton Public Library  
Labelle Branch Library  
Lagrange Branch Library

Politics

Local

Chris Flanagan was appointed to the position of County Clerk by Governor Jay Nixon. The office had previously been held by Regina Dredge.

State

All of Lewis County is included in Missouri's 4th District in the Missouri House of Representatives and is represented by  Craig Redmon (R-Canton).

 

All of Lewis County is a part of Missouri's 18th District in the Missouri Senate and is currently represented by Brian Munzlinger (R-Williamstown).

Federal

All of Lewis County is included in Missouri's 6th Congressional District and is currently represented by Sam Graves (R-Tarkio) in the U.S. House of Representatives.

Missouri presidential preference primary (2008)

Former U.S. Senator Hillary Clinton (D-New York) received more votes, a total of 619, than any candidate from either party in Lewis County during the 2008 presidential primary.

Communities

Cities and towns

Canton
Ewing
La Belle
La Grange
Lewistown
Monticello (county seat)

Unincorporated communities

 Argola
 Benjamin
 Deer Ridge
 Derrahs
 Dover
 Durgen
 Durham
 Gilead
 Laura
 Maywood
 Midway
 Salem
 Santuzza
 Sellers
 Steffenville
 Ten Mile
 Tolona
 Weber
 Williamstown

See also
National Register of Historic Places listings in Lewis County, Missouri

References

External links
 Lewis County website (provided by University of Missouri Extension)
 Digitized 1930 Plat Book of Lewis County  from University of Missouri Division of Special Collections, Archives, and Rare Books

 
Quincy–Hannibal area
1833 establishments in Missouri
Populated places established in 1833
Missouri counties on the Mississippi River
Quincy, Illinois micropolitan area